The women's Omnium competition of the cycling events at the 2011 Pan American Games was held between October 19 and 20 at the Pan American Velodrome in Guadalajara. This event is a new addition to the track cycling program at the Pan American Games.

Results

Flying Lap

Points Race

Elimination Race

Individual Pursuit

Scratch Race

500m Time Trial

Final standings

References

Track cycling at the 2011 Pan American Games
Women's omnium
Pan